= Heterotropic =

Heterotropic may refer to:

- Heterotropic allosteric modulation of enzymes
- Heterotropic modulation of the chemical synapse
